Kiblawan, officially the Municipality of Kiblawan, is a 2nd class municipality in the province of Davao del Sur, Philippines. According to the 2020 census, it has a population of 49,381 people.

History
Kiblawan was established from the barangays Bagumbayan, Paitan, Kiblawan, Kibungbung, Manual, New Sibonga, Maraga-a, Ihan, Bunot, Latian, Balasiao, Apik and Dapok belonging to the municipality of Sulop, via Republic Act No. 4748 signed by President Ferdinand Marcos on June 18, 1966.

Geography

Climate

Barangays
Kiblawan is politically subdivided into 30 barangays.

Demographics

Economy

References

External links
 Kiblawan Profile at the DTI Cities and Municipalities Competitive Index
 [ Philippine Standard Geographic Code]
 Philippine Census Information
 Local Governance Performance Management System

Municipalities of Davao del Sur